The Tijuana metropolitan area, and in Spanish the Zona Metropolitana de Tijuana, is located by the Pacific Ocean in Mexico. The 2010 census placed the Tijuana metropolitan area as the fifth largest city by population in the country with 1,751,302 people. The census bureau defined metropolitan area comprises three municipalities: Tijuana, Tecate and Rosarito Beach. Yet sources commonly include Tecate Municipality in the metropolitan area as the urban area between Tijuana and Tecate grows, the commuting populace increases - ultimately further developing the southern areas of San Diego–Tijuana, and the three municipalities maintain strong relationships and cooperation.

See also

 San Diego metropolitan area

References

 
Metropolitan areas of Baja California